Ferrissia mcneili, common name the hood ancylid, is a species of small freshwater snail or limpet, an aquatic gastropod mollusk in the family Planorbidae, the ram's horn snails and their allies.

Distribution 
This freshwater limpet is endemic to the United States.

References

Planorbidae
Gastropods described in 1925
Taxonomy articles created by Polbot